Papilio polyxenes, the (eastern) black swallowtail, American swallowtail or parsnip swallowtail, is a butterfly found throughout much of North America. It is the state butterfly of Oklahoma and New Jersey. An extremely similar-appearing species, Papilio joanae, occurs in the Ozark Mountains region, but it appears to be closely related to Papilio machaon, rather than P. polyxenes. The species is named after the figure in Greek mythology, Polyxena (pron.: /pəˈlɪksɨnə/; Greek: Πολυξένη), who was the youngest daughter of King Priam of Troy. Its caterpillar is called the parsley worm because the caterpillar feeds on parsley.

The Papilio polyxenes demonstrates polyandry and a lek mating system, showing no male parental care and display sites. Females are therefore able to choose males based on these sites and males are the only resource the females find at these sites.

Taxonomy
Papilio polyxenes is part of the tribe Papilionini of the swallowtail butterfly family, Papilionidae. The members of this tribe all have tails on the hindwings, and therefore include species named swallowtail. P. polyxenes is part of the genus Papilio, which is the biggest group of the family Papilionidae. Subspecies polyxenes, once found in Cuba, is now considered likely extinct.   Members of this genus typically feed on plants of the family Lauraceae, Rutaceae and Umbelliferae.

Distribution
Papilio polyxenes are found from southern Canada through to South America. In North America they are more common east of the Rocky Mountains. They are usually found in open areas like fields, parks, marshes or deserts, and they prefer tropical or temperate habitats. It is possibly extirpated from Cuba.

Morphology

Eggs and larvae
Eggs are pale yellow. Young larvae are mostly black and white with a saddle, and older larvae are green with black transverse bands containing yellow spots.

Caterpillar and chrysalis
This caterpillar absorbs toxins from the host plants, and therefore tastes poor to bird predators. The black swallowtail caterpillar has an orange "forked gland", called the osmeterium. When in danger, the osmeterium, which looks like a snake's tongue, everts and releases a foul smell to repel predators.

The pupae may be green or brown, but not depending on surroundings or the background on which they have pupated. The color of the chrysalis is determined by a local genetic balance that ensures the majority of pupae will blend in. A section of the green pupae will turn a much darker green at the very end of the pupae stage. This color change occurs a few hours to a full day before hatching. Unusually, this butterfly's chrysalis is girdled with a loop, with its feet attached to the silk pad, which helps the butterfly to unfold its very large wings when crawling out.

Sexual dimorphism

The black swallowtail has a wingspan of 6.9–8.4 cm, and females are typically larger than males. The upper wing surface is black with two rows of yellow spots – these spots are large and bright in males and smaller and lighter in females. Females have a prominent blue area between these two rows, while males have a much less prominent blue area. These differences give rise to effective Batesian mimicry of Battus philenor seen in females.

Both sexes show a red spot with a black bullseye on the inner hind margin of the hindwings and an isolated yellow spot on the front edge of the wings. The ventral side of wings of males and females are essentially identical: forewings have two rows of pale yellow spots, and hindwings have rows of bright orange spots separated by areas of powdery blue. The ventral side also acts as an effective mimic for both males and females for protection against predators.

Mimicry
Female markings are similar to those of B. philenor, allowing females to engage in dorsal mimicry to reduce risk of predation by birds that preferentially prey on the black swallowtail. Females have evolved dorsal mimicry because they spend more time revealing their dorsal wing side during oviposition. The ventral wing surface of the black swallowtail also mimics that of B. philenor, so both males and females are protected when their ventral wing surface is displayed.

Intrasexual selection
Male black swallowtails can sometimes mimic the female wing-back pattern, and therefore succeed in reduced predation as well. However, males of the typical coloration are more successful in intrasexual competition for mating territories compared to the males who mimic the female wing pattern. Females have no preference based on wing markings, and are equally likely to mate with a typical versus an alternative coloration. Therefore, male-male intrasexual selection is of greater importance than female mate choice in maintaining the classic male wing-back coloration and pattern.

Life cycle

Females lay single eggs on host plants, usually on the new foliage and occasionally on flowers. The eggs stage lasts 4–9 days, the larval stage 10–30 days, and the pupal stage 18 days. The duration of these stages may vary depending on temperature and the species of the host plants.

Emergence
Winter is spent in the chrysalis stage, and adults will emerge in the spring to seek out host plants. Adults will emerge in the mornings on a daily basis. First brood adults will fly from mid-May until late June, second brood adults will fly from early July until late August, and occasionally a partial third brood will occur that will emerge later in the season.

Life expectancy
Members of the black swallowtail are long lived compared to other butterflies that inhabit temperate zones. They encounter little predation and are quick and agile if they are disturbed. However, mortality from predators will occur during roosting and during unfavorable weather due to the associated increase in predation. Adult butterflies are at the highest risk for predation when they are incapable of flight or are starved from poor weather.

Food plants
Papilio polyxenes use a variety of herbs in the carrot family (Apiaceae), but will choose the food plants for their larvae based on visual and chemical variations. Host plant odor is one of the cues involved in the selection of landing sites for oviposition. The responses to these cues are innate, and feeding on a host plant as a larva does not increase the preference for that plant as an adult.

Species of host plants include:
 American angelica, Angelica atropurpurea
 Hairy angelica, Angelica venenosa
 Dill, Anthem graveolens 
 Cutleaf waterparsnip, Berula erecta
 Spotted water hemlock, Cicuta maculata'
 Canadian honewort, Cryptotaenia canadensis Queen Anne's lace, Daucus carota Wedgeleaf eryngo, Eryngium cuneifolium Fennel, Foeniculum vulgare Cow parsnip, Heracleum maximum Lovage, Levisticum officinale Cucumber magnolia, Magnolia acuminata Sweetbay magnolia, Magnolia virginiana Sweet cicely, Osmorhiza claytonii Long-styled sweet cicely, Osmorhiza longistylis Canby's dropwort, Oxypolis canbyi Water cowbane, Oxypolis filiformis Parsnip, Pastinaca sativa Parsley, Petroselinum crispum Mock bishopweed, Ptilimnium capillaceum Rue, Ruta graveolens Water parsnip, Sium suave Roughfruit scaleseed, Spermolepis divaricata Yellow pimpernel, Taenidia integerrima Northern prickly ash, Zanthoxylum americanum Golden alexanders, ZiziaBehavior

Thermoregulation
Core body, or thoracic temperatures of around 24 degrees Celsius are necessary for flight. Therefore, the black swallowtail will regulate thoracic temperatures by behaviorally changing their abdomen position, wing position, orientation to the sun, perching duration, and perching height. In lower temperatures, butterflies will raise their abdomens above flattened wings, and will perch relatively close to the ground. In higher temperatures, butterflies will lower their abdomens in the shade of their wings. Higher temperatures are also associated with shorter perch durations, greater flight durations and higher perch heights.

Territorial defense
Male butterflies secure territories to use in mate location and courtship. These territories contain no significant concentration of nectar sources, larval host plants or night settling sites. Once secured, a male will maintain exclusive use of a territory 95% of the time. Males will aggressively chase other males who approach their territory, and then return to their territory. Success in defending a territory depends on the number of competitors and his previous success, but the size of the male is not a contributing factor. Males that emerge early in the brood are more likely to defend a female-preferred territory. These males will have early access to available territories, and will choose the ones that are most preferred by females. What makes a territory desirable by females remains unknown, and is only measured by the number of aggressive encounters between males and the overall mating frequency at these sites.

Male territories are generally of high relative elevation and topographic distinctness. This feature serves as an advantage to the lek mating system described later, as males will be concentrated in predictable locations and will be easy to encounter by females.

Aggression
In previous studies, nearly 80% of successful courtship flights were confined to a male's territory. Because a preferred territory site is crucial in mating success, males are extremely aggressive in maintaining their territory. Black swallowtails have a 4:1 male biased sex ratio, and a low female mating frequency which leads to intense male-male competition.

Mating systems

Protandry
The black swallowtail is protandrous, meaning males emerge before females. This emergence pattern is advantageous, because males that emerge earlier have a greater success in competing for superior territories, indicated by female preference. These superior territories will most likely still be available for early emerging males, and securing one of these territories is highly predictive of mating success. Furthermore, female fertility is directly correlated with their weight at emergence. This favors larger females, and explains why they emerge later to prolong the larval feeding period. Male success is not dependent on size, so selection favors early emergence to get the best territories preferred by females, though this will most likely result in smaller males. However, there is a drawback to this emergence system. For biological reasons, overall male mating frequency decreases as the mating season goes on. Therefore, early emerging males with early access to preferred territories will not be able to mate as often later in the mating season when female emergence is at its peak.

Lek mating

This type of territorial organization leads the black swallowtail to engage in a lek mating system. These butterflies satisfy the four criteria for lekking behavior, as defined by J.W. Bradbury: (1) there is no male parental care, (2) males aggregate at specific sites for display, (3) the only resource females find at the lek are the males themselves and (4) females can select their mates.

The territory that has the most male-male encounters can be seen as being the most desirable to both males and females, and is also the territory that has the highest female visitation rate. Hilltop leks give the advantage to females because they make it easy to locate mates, and competition for superiority creates an array of males who have already demonstrated their quality as a mate.

Copulation
Males can only mate twice a day, but females will mate more than once to replace a sperm supply that has deteriorated with time. P. polyxenes has a long mating period due to females tendency to mating multiple times and having a broad emergence period. This allows males to mate several times during their lifetime, despite only being able to copulate twice on the same day. The black swallowtail engages in brief courtship flights, and copulations will last around 45 minutes.

Similar species
 Old World swallowtail (Papilio machaon)
 Indra swallowtail (Papilio indra)
 Short-tailed swallowtail (Papilio brevicauda)
 Anise swallowtail (Papilio zelicaon)

Gallery

References

Eastern Black Swallowtail Butterfly: Large format reference quality (free) photographs Cirrus Digital Imaging

 

Ferris, CD. and Emmel, J.F. (1982). Discussion of Papilio coloro W.G. Wright (= Papilio rudkini F. and R. Chermock) and Papilio polyxenes Fabricius. Bulletin of the Allyn Museum 76: 13 pp.This article is adapted in part from this page at the USGS Northern Prairie Wildlife Research Center''.

External links

"Black Swallowtail (Papilio polyxenes) (Fabricius, 1775)", Butterflies of Canada
eastern black swalltowtail on the UF / IFAS Featured Creatures.

polyxenes
Butterflies of North America
Butterflies of Central America
Butterflies of the Caribbean
Papilionidae of South America
Butterflies of Cuba
Butterflies described in 1775
Symbols of Oklahoma
Taxa named by Johan Christian Fabricius